Service book or Service Book may refer to:
 Liturgical book, giving the text of a religious service
 Seaman Service Book, a continuous record of a seaman's service. 
 Service book (motor vehicle), recording service history of the vehicle

See also
 Logbook